The 2013–14 Meistriliiga season was the 24th season of the Meistriliiga, the top level of ice hockey in Estonia. Six teams participated in the league, and Tallinn Viiking Sport won the championship.

Regular season

Playoffs

Semifinals 
 Tallinn Viiking Sport – Tallinn HC Panter Purikad 2:0 (10:1, 13:2)
 Narva PSK – Tartu Kalev-Välk 1:1 (4:5, 3:1)

3rd place game 
 Narva PSK – Tallinn HC Panter Purikad 2:0 (5:2, 4:3 OT)

Final 
 Tallinn Viiking Sport – Tartu Kalev-Välk 3:0 (4:3, 7:0, 4:3 OT)

External links
 Estonian Ice Hockey Federation

Est
2013 in Estonian sport
2014 in Estonian sport
Meistriliiga (ice hockey) seasons